USS Tanguingui (SP-126) was an armed motor yacht that served in the United States Navy as a patrol vessel from 1917 to 1919.
 
Tanguingui was built as a civilian yacht in 1915 by the New York Yacht Launch and Engine Company at Morris Heights, New York. The U.S. Navy acquired Tanguingui under a free lease from her owner, Mr. J. C. McCoy of New York City, on 28 June 1917 for use as a patrol boat during World War I. She was commissioned on 31 October 1917 as USS Tanguingui (SP-126).

Assigned to the 7th Naval District, Tanguingui operated out of Key West, Florida, patrolling along the extreme southern coast of Florida to prevent incursions by German submarines. Following the Armistice with Germany that ended the war on 11 November 1918, she continued to serve the Navy until her main battery, small arms, and ammunition were removed on 6 February 1919.

Tanguinguis name was stricken from the Navy List on 7 April 1919, and she was returned to her owner on 21 April 1919.

Notes

References

NavSource Online: Section Patrol Craft Photo Archive: Tanguingui (SP 126)

Patrol vessels of the United States Navy
World War I patrol vessels of the United States
Ships built in Morris Heights, Bronx
1915 ships
Individual yachts